Jorge Soto may refer to:

 Jorge Soto (footballer) (born 1971), retired Peruvian footballer
 Jorge Soto (golfer) (1945–2011), Argentine professional golfer
 Jorge Soto (cyclist) (born 1986), Uruguayan road bicycle racer and track cyclist
 Jorge Soto (weightlifter) (1921-1973), Puerto Rican Olympic weightlifter